Pachady is an agricultural village situated in the state of Kerala and the Idukki district under Udumbanchola taluk in India. It is situated 4 km away from Nedumkandam Town. It is a hilly area with most of the population working in cardamom plantations.

References

Villages in Idukki district